Mason Neil Martin (born June 2, 1999) is an American professional baseball first baseman in the Pittsburgh Pirates organization.

Amateur career
Martin attended Southridge High School in Kennewick, Washington, where he played football and baseball. In 2017, his senior year, he hit .507 with five home runs and ten stolen bases. After his senior year, he was drafted by the Pittsburgh Pirates in the 17th round of the 2017 Major League Baseball draft. He signed for a $350,000 signing bonus, forgoing his commitment to play college baseball at Gonzaga University.

Professional career
After signing with the Pirates, Martin made his professional debut with the Rookie-level Gulf Coast League Pirates, slashing .307/.457/.630 with 11 home runs (breaking the GCL Pirates record) and 22 RBIs over 39 games, earning the title of Gulf Coast League Most Valuable Player. Martin began the 2018 season with the West Virginia Power of the Class A South Atlantic League, but was reassigned to the Bristol Pirates of the Rookie-level Appalachian League halfway through the year. Over 104 games between the two teams, he batted .220 with 14 home runs and 58 RBIs. In 2019, he began the year with the Greensboro Grasshoppers of the Class A South Atlantic League (with whom he was named an All-Star) before being promoted to the Bradenton Marauders of the Class A-Advanced Florida State League in July, with whom he finished the season. Over 131 games, Martin slashed .254/.351/.558 with 35 home runs and 129 RBIs. His 35 home runs were fourth in all of the minor leagues and his 129 RBIs were first. Following the season's end, he was named Pittsburgh's Minor League Player of the Year. 

Martin did not play a minor league game in 2020 since the season was cancelled due to the COVID-19 pandemic. Martin was assigned to the Altoona Curve of the Double-A Northeast for a majority the 2021 season, slashing .242/.318/.481 with 22 home runs, 75 RBIs, and 29 doubles over 112 games. Following the end of Altoona's season in mid-September, he was promoted to the Indianapolis Indians of the Triple-A East, appearing in eight games in which he hit three home runs to end the year. Martin led all Pittsburgh minor leaguers in home runs (25) and runs batted in (81), while also striking out 171 times over 439 at-bats. He returned to the Indians for the 2022 season. Over 134 games, he slashed .210/.287/.410 with 19 home runs, 74 RBIs, and 29 doubles with 194 strikeouts over 481 at-bats.

References

External links

1999 births
Living people
Baseball first basemen
Baseball players from Washington (state)
Gulf Coast Pirates players
Bristol Pirates players
West Virginia Power players
Greensboro Grasshoppers players
Bradenton Marauders players
Altoona Curve players
Indianapolis Indians players